Fritz André (born 18 September 1946) is a Haitian football defender who played for Haiti in the 1974 FIFA World Cup. He also played for Violette A.C.

References

External links
FIFA profile

1946 births
Haitian footballers
Haiti international footballers
Association football defenders
Violette AC players
Ligue Haïtienne players
1974 FIFA World Cup players
Living people